Masaya is a city in Nicaragua.

Masaya may also refer to:

Places
 Masaya Department in Nicaragua
 Masaya Volcano in Nicaragua

Other uses
 Masaya (given name)
 Masaya (company), a Japanese video game publisher
 , an America cargo ship sunk during World War II